Rowing was contested at the 2013 Summer Universiade from July 6 to 8 at the Rowing Centre in Kazan, Russia.

Medal summary

Medal table

Men's events

Women's events

References

External links
2013 Summer Universiade – Rowing
Results book

 
Universiade
2013 Summer Universiade events